Daniel Smith is an American painter who resides in Bozeman, Montana. He is known best for his realistic wildlife portrayals.

Biography
In 1988, Smith won the US Federal Duck Stamp with a painting of a snow goose.

Legacy
Painting full-time for over twenty years, the artist's works are in collections including The Hiram Blauvelt Art Museum, Leigh Yawkey Woodson Art Museum, and The Wildlife Experience. Smith is in the annual Western Visions exhibit at the National Museum of Wildlife Art and Masters of the American West exhibit at the Autry National Center. He has been awarded by the Society of Animal Artists. Through his art, the artist endorses and aids many conservation efforts. Nature is the sole inspiration for his fruitful career.

References

External links
 Official website

20th-century American painters
American male painters
21st-century American painters
People from Bozeman, Montana
Artists from Montana
Living people
Year of birth missing (living people)
American bird artists
20th-century American male artists